Khamhariya (rewa) is a village and a gram panchayat under semariya Vidhan sabha Constituency in rewa district in the Indian state of Madhy Pradesh.

The Khamhariya has a historical golden past and a rich heritage of its own. It is situated on the bank of the river Beehad, 8 km away from rewa.

The Khamhariya was the independent Pawai (including many other villages named sumeda, babupur and bakhiya  

Village Khamhariya was an independent pawai and has never fallen under the area of so-called Ilakedar's of rewa. Independent pawai means the lagaan or the taxes of the Village was directly deposited to the Maharaj saheb of rewa.

Villages in Damoh district